Louis Phélypeaux (18 August 1705 – 27 February 1777) Count of Saint-Florentin, Marquis (1725) and Duke of La Vrillière (1770), was a French politician.

Biography
Son of Louis Phélypeaux, Marquis de La Vrillière, and Françoise de Mailly-Nesle (1688–1742), he succeeded his father as Secretary of State for Protestant Affairs, with responsibility for Huguenots. Appointed minister for the Department of the Maison du Roi by Louis XV in 1749, he held the post until 1775, setting a record for ministerial service. He was named to the Order of the Holy Spirit, where he served as chancellor. After the dismissal of Choiseul in December 1770, he served as Foreign Minister until June 1771. His use of lettres de cachet in the La Chalotais case was controversial and he resigned his ministerial posts in 1775.

In 1724 he married Amélie Ernestine de Platen (d. 1752). He had Chalgrin design the Hôtel de Saint-Florentin. This later passed to Talleyrand and to James Mayer de Rothschild, and is now part of the American Embassy, Paris.

See also
 Louis Phélypeaux (disambiguation)
 Phélypeaux

References

1705 births
1777 deaths
French politicians
Members of the French Academy of Sciences